Ana Carolina Ardohaín Dos Santos (born 17 January 1978) is an Argentine model, television personality, dancer, television host and actress. She is widely known by the nickname Pampita, a diminutive for La Pampa, the province where she was born.

Personal life
Carolina Ardohaín was born on 17 January 1978 in General Acha, La Pampa, Argentina: she was one of very few people baptised at the monastery of Nuestra Señora del Pilar in Recoleta, Buenos Aires. Her father is Argentine, her mother is Brazilian.

Pampita is the mother of a daughter, Blanca Vicuña Ardohaín (born 15 May 2006 and deceased 8 September 2012), and three sons, Bautista Vicuña Ardohaín (born 29 February 2008), Beltrán Vicuña Ardohaín (born 8 June 2012) and Benicio Vicuña Ardohaín (born 12 October 2014). Their father is the Chilean actor Benjamín Vicuña, boyfriend of Pampita from July 2005 to December 2015.

Pampita on 22 November 2019 married the gastronomic entrepreneur Roberto García Moritan; this couple has a daughter, Ana García Moritán Ardohaín, who was born on 22 July 2021.

Career
Since 2013, Carolina Ardohaín represents the car makes Citroën and Citroën DS line. In May 2016, Pampita took part in the dancing reality show Bailando 2016 as a member of the jury. From June 2017 she present the talk show Pampita Online. In March 2022, she host the program El hotel de los famosos, together with Leandro Leunis, in eltrece.

Acting career
She debuted in 2002 as actress in the first season of the Argentine telenovela juvenil (teen telenovela) Rebelde Way with the role of Lulú, the teacher of dance. In 2005 Pampita starred in the Argentine romantic telenovela Doble vida with the role of Ema, who is the first of co-protagonists. Pampita made her cinema debut in the 2009 Chilean film Súper, todo Chile adentro with the secondary role of Camila Hudson. Pampita starred in the 2015 Chilean television series Familia moderna with the role of Magdalena. In the 2017 Argentine film Desearás al hombre de tu hermana Pampita played the role of Ofelia, her first leading role.

Filmography

As an actress

Television roles

Film roles

As an  herself

Realities shows

References

External links

 (in Spanish)

1978 births
Living people
People from La Pampa Province
Argentine people of Brazilian descent
Argentine female models
Argentine film actresses
Actresses of Brazilian descent
Expatriate models in Chile
21st-century Argentine women
Participants in Argentine reality television series
Bailando por un Sueño (Argentine TV series) participants
Bailando por un Sueño (Argentine TV series) winners
Bailando por un Sueño (Argentine TV series) judges